The West Coast Eagles are an Australian rules football team based in Perth, Western Australia. Their 2011 season was their 25th season in the Australian Football League (AFL), their tenth season under premiership coach John Worsfold, and the fourth season with Darren Glass as captain. In the previous season, West Coast finished last on the ladder to receive their first wooden spoon. At the conclusion of round ten, West Coast had won five of their nine games and lost four, but over the remainder of the season won 12 of their 13 games to finish fourth at the end of the regular season.

At the conclusion of the season, Glass was awarded the Club Champion Award as the club's best and fairest, with Matt Priddis finishing runner-up. Josh Kennedy was the leading goal-kicker, kicking 59 goals throughout the season.

Background
The Eagles' leadership group for 2011 was composed of the captain Darren Glass, vice-captain Beau Waters, as well as Andrew Embley, Shannon Hurn, Josh Kennedy, Mark LeCras, Matt Priddis, Adam Selwood, Scott Selwood and Beau Waters.

Playing list
Ashley Hansen, Matthew Spangher, Will Sullivan, Adam Cockie and Tony Notte were delisted. Tim Houlihan was delisted but was later re-listed by the Eagles in the 2011 Rookie draft.

Draft selections
National draft selections
4 - Andrew Gaff (Oakleigh Chargers)
26 - Jack Darling (West Perth) (priority)
29 - Scott Lycett (Port Adelaide)
62 - Jacob Brennan (East Fremantle) (F/S)
Pre-season draft selections
5 - Blayne Wilson (Peel Thunder)
Rookie draft selections
10 - Tim Houlihan (West Coast Eagles) (re-drafted)
27 - Anton Hamp (Claremont)
44 - Jeremy McGovern (Claremont)

West Coast also upgraded rookies Lewis Stevenson, Callum Wilson and Andrew Strijk to the senior list using selections 78, 84 and 93 respectively.

Statistics

Season summary
The first round of the 2011 NAB Cup was played using a round-robin format where the Eagles,  and  each played each other once in a series of games held at Patersons Stadium on 13 February. The Eagles won both of their games, progressing through to the NAB Cup quarter-finals where they defeated  by 37 points to progress to a semi-final against ; however they lost their semi-final by 24 points and were eliminated from the NAB Cup.

After finishing with the wooden spoon in 2010, most commentators predicted the Eagles to finish in the bottom four. The team won the Western Derby by 33 points in round 8, their first since 2007.

Results

Ladder

Tribunal cases
Seven West Coast Eagles were cited by the Match Review Panel for eight separate offences during the 2011 season: Quinten Lynch was the only player suspended, receiving a one-match suspension after the round 14 game against  for forceful front-on contact with Marc Murphy:

Awards

League awards
 John Worsfold was named Coach of the Year at the 2011 AFL Coaches' Association Awards.
 Dean Cox and Darren Glass were selected as ruckman and full-back respectively in the 2011 All-Australian team. Andrew Embley, Josh Kennedy and Matt Priddis were also named in the initial squad of 40 players, but were not selected in the final team.
 Nic Naitanui was nominated as a finalist for the 2011 AFL Mark of the Year.
 Luke Shuey (round two), Jack Darling (round six) and Andrew Gaff (round 19) were nominated for the 2011 AFL Rising Star award, with Shuey finishing second, Darling fifth and Gaff seventh overall.
 Matt Priddis polled the most club votes in the 2011 Brownlow Medal, receiving 19 votes to finish equal ninth.

Club awards
The 2011 West Coast Eagles Club Champion Awards were held on Friday, 7 October 2011, at Crown Perth. Darren Glass was named Club Champion and Best Finals Player, Brett Jones received the Best Clubman award and Luke Shuey was awarded Rookie of the Year. Josh Kennedy was leading goal-kicker, kicking 59 goals for the year. Mark LeCras (47 goals) and Mark Nicoski (41 goals) was next. Adam Selwood, Richard Godfrey and Glenn Stewart were inducted as life members of the club. The voting for the Club Champion Award went as follows: 

 Glass and Priddis finished equal first on votes, but Glass was awarded Club Champion on countback, having played less games.
 Embley and Nicoski both polled the same number of votes, but Embley finished higher, having played less games.

Notes
 "Points" refers to carry-over points accrued following the sanction. For example, 154.69 points draw a one-match suspension, with 54.69 carry-over points (for every 100 points, a one-match suspension is given).

References

External links
2011 West Coast Eagles Fixtures
West Coast Eagles Official AFL Site
Official Site of the Australian Football League

West Coast Eagles seasons
West Coast Eagles